The 2022 IndianOil Durand Cup group stage was played from 16 August to 5 September 2022. A total of 20 teams, consisting 11 ISL clubs, 5 I-League clubs and 4 Indian Armed Forces teams, competed in the group stage to decide the 8 places in the knockout stage.

Format
In the group stage, each group is played on a single round-robin format. The top two teams advance to the knockout stage.

Tiebreakers
The teams are ranked according to points (3 points for a win, 1 point for a draw, 0 points for a loss). If tied on points, tiebreakers were applied in the following order:
Points in head-to-head matches among tied teams;
Goal difference in head-to-head matches among tied teams;
Goals scored in head-to-head matches among tied teams;
If more than two teams are tied, and after applying all head-to-head criteria above, a subset of teams are still tied, all head-to-head criteria above are reapplied exclusively to this subset of teams;
Goal difference in all group matches;
Goals scored in all group matches;
Drawing of lots.

Centralised venues
On 11 July, Durand Cup Organising Committee announced that for the first time the tournament would be played across more than one city—3 cities—including Kolkata. The other two venues were decided to be Imphal and Guwahati. The four groups were assigned one centralised venue keeping in mind that at least one of the teams in the group must be based from the host city.

 Group A: Kolkata, West Bengal (Vivekananda Yuba Bharati Krirangan and Kishore Bharati Krirangan)
 Group B: Kolkata, West Bengal (Vivekananda Yuba Bharati Krirangan and Kishore Bharati Krirangan)
 Group C: Imphal, Manipur (Khuman Lampak Stadium)
 Group D: Guwahati, Assam (Indira Gandhi Athletic Stadium)

Groups

Group A

Matches

Group B

Matches

Group C

Matches

Group D

Matches

References 

2022 Durand Cup
August 2022 sports events in India
September 2022 sports events in India